American singer-songwriter Madonna is recognized by various as a feminist icon. Throughout best part of her career, her forays into feminism, womanhood and media representation of many conceptions of women would attract a considerable interest of numerous feminist scholars and others, shaping views on Madonna. She has been also noted for her advocacy of women's rights in her own way.

Labeled as an almost "sacred feminist icon" by professor Sut Jhally, her feminist reception has been noted for attracting both derogatory and celebratory cultural analysis. Scholars such as Karlene Faith, Sarah Churchwell and Mary Cross have remarked the polarization on Madonna, while also explaining that is not only with her but feminism itself is divided by many waves, agendas and ideologies.

The advent of Madonna was understood by a notable number of scholars as a boost for feminism in music and media, for different measurements. In Girl Heroes, author claimed that her influence "ushered" in contemporary girl culture the representation of female popstar as "virtual teacher, mentor and role model". Scholar feminist Camille Paglia believes she "changed" the face of feminism. Madonna became a well-known role model for many generations of women, and analysts that includes Strawberry Saroyan have seen it as "one of the most relevant aspects" of her legacy. She was also blasted in equal measurement, while French academic Georges-Claude Guilbert once commented the amount of reproaches that Madonna gets is proportional to her status as a role model. For other group of critics and academics ranging from Ty Burr to Marcel Danesi and Robert C Sickels, Madonna's media representation of women's roles crossed boundaries in popular culture. Up to early 2020s, her path continued to be recognized and denied, while a contemporary aged Madonna, was criticized by observers like Piers Morgan or appreciated by Sarah Vine and Naomi Wolf among others.

Critical scope 

Madonna has received academic attention, and this includes areas of feminism. Canadian pundit Mark Steyn once stated "she has her feminist significance pondered by college courses".

The feminist attention Madonna has commanded is vast. Mary Cross stated that "Madonna has inspired reams of feminist commentary", while Canadian professor Michael Real from Royal Roads University similarly argued that "many feminists have written extensively of Madonna". An author explained that gender play has been central to Madonna's work, which has evoked "a lot of commentary by feminist academics and journalists".

Authors in Future Texts (2015) explained that "Madonna remains a center of debate and contestation in the postfeminist era". Abigail Gardner from University of Gloucestershire, states in Rock On (2016), that Madonna perhaps holds a privileged place in the studies of feminism than any other pop star. Scholars in Ageing, Popular Culture and Contemporary Feminism (2014), made similar claims determining from the other celebrities reviewed that Madonna is "easily the most overdetermined figure in the interest of feminist scholars working in the field of popular culture studies". Feminist Review Collective in Contesting Feminist Orthodoxies (1996), made the comparison between Oprah Winfrey and Madonna, saying that in contrast to Winfrey, Madonna's life and cultural appeal have been minutely examined within a broad-ranging set of critical and feminist discourses.

Categorizing Madonna within feminism 

The figure of Madonna has been discussed from various feminism theories and waves, dividing opinions. Most feminists, according to Sara Mills have been highly appreciative of her work, but others write from a critical feminist criticism. The feminist debate surrounding Madonna, especially from American feminists during the 1990s, was visible for many, described by Czech writer Libuše Moníková as "not so superfluous". Academic Pamela Robertson in Guilty Pleasures (1996), commented:

The divisive perceptions were exemplified by French scholar Georges-Claude Guilbert citing the conference "Madonna: Feminist Icon or Material" at University of California, Santa Barbara organized by the Women's Center, which led Guilbert to conclude that it shows that question is not easy to decide, as some feminists left the conference declaring that they hadn't been able to make up their minds. In 2012, Spanish cultural critic Víctor Lenore convened a researchers panel discussion her as a feminist icon, with all sorts of feelings. Some contextualized broadest views; "not everyone agrees that [Madonna] is feminist or empowering" but not least because not everyone agrees what it means to be feminist or empowering, wrote professor Sarah Churchwell for The Guardian in 2018. Professor and author Mary Cross similarly stated, "feminism itself is divided, not only about Madonna but about what feminism represents".

Positive 
Madonna was better received by Non-Lacanian feminists, a group that greatly valued disruptions of unity and "therefore greatly value Madonna". In Encyclopedia of Women in Today's World (2011), editors explained that in the wake of second-wave feminism, Madonna "achieved great critical and commercial success by carving out a niche for the sexually empowered and entrepreneurial female popstar". On the contrary, Elissa Strauss from The Forward describes that for second-wavers, Madonna is "all wrong" but for the third-wave "Madonna is a revolutionary pop star who taught us that we could be sexy and strong". American philosopher Susan Bordo explained that Madonna "has never advertised herself as disdainful of feminism or constructed feminists as man-haters". Hilary Pilkington from University of Birmingham, similarly stated in Looking West? (2002), Madonna was a model of New feminism.

Various feminists, according to professor Robertson, embraced Madonna for a variety of reasons, including what they saw in the singer, such as self-empowerment or independence in both economic sphere and authorship. By 1990, Camille Paglia called Madonna a "true feminist" labeling her as "the future of feminism". Retrospectively, Paglia by 2017 felt that "it happened".

Negative and mixed 
According to Cross, some "feminists have taken Madonna severely to task". From a similar description, French academic Georges-Claude Guilbert said some feminists "have been outrageously negative about Madonna". At the time she debuted, her critics supported Cyndi Lauper instead of her.

Robertson explained that many criticized Madonna because she challenged "feminism's unified concept of 'woman'". However, many of her "opponents", Guilbert said, such as Rosemary Hennessy and Sheila Jeffreys before being "enemies of Madonna", are enemies of the postmodern, as they seen it as "the cultural capital of the late patriarchy". During Madonna's heyday of feminist reception, Ruth Conniff, declared "we can do better than this" in our "post-feminist age", further describing "we need a better role model than Madonna. We need a sense that we can do something more productive for society". Professor Carmela J. Garritano from Texas A&M University said that Madonna's feminism like her recording works, is for sale, and celebration of her feminist image entails celebration of commercial success that has enabled it.

In Feminist Phoenix: The Rise and Fall of a Feminist Counterculture (1999), authors argued that Madonna's critics came from a generational issue because she left most older feminists, illustrating a major problem of countercultural change. They claimed that Madonna depressed these feminists in the same way that flappers of the Jazz Age depressed suffragists. Jacqueline Edmondson, in Music in American Life (2013) made a similar observation by saying, that some saw Madonna "as an agent against the gains women had made during the feminist movements of the 1960s and 1970s".

Within the compendium The Madonna Connection (1993), scholars compiled surveys from college students and newspapers about Madonna, determining that for others, she represented "the lowest and/or most dangerous form of the feminine", being described as "the antithesis of feminism". By 1985, an editor described "Madonna's whole image, in fact, is like a finger-flip to feminists". Kurt Loder commented, "Madonna's whole act [...] seems custom-designed to gag feminists of both sexes".

After reviewing bell hooks critical commentaries towards Madonna in the 1990s, Rosemary Pringle of Griffith University concluded that Madonna's status as a feminist heroine makes sense only from the perspective of a white woman, and thus depends on the cultural and racially marked context in which her image circulated, or at least in the United States.

Neutral, reviews on criticisms and an aged Madonna 

Zoe Lewis, a contributor from The Times, added the phrase "Madonna syndrome" to her description that "women are often the worst enemies of feminism because of our genetic make-up". In Lonette Stonisch's view, feminists believe that the "traditional feminists persistently misread Madonna, either because they feel threatened by her victories, or because they wish she'd keep her clothes on, or because they want a more serious examination and resolution of feminine objectification". At some stage of her career, some considered agents from lesbian feminism "responsible" for the fact that Madonna "remains misunderstood in certain quarters".

Some feminists, Guilbert said, "vigorously" reviewed Madonna but "they don't really choose sides". He cited Yvonne Tasker and Mary Joe Frug. Even Frug, was "afraid" that the work of Madonna might be misinterpreted; saying she herself believes in some Madonna's feminists declarations, but she worries: "There probably a number of people who won't. Anyone who looks as much as sex worker as she does couldn't possibly be in charge of herself, they are likely to say".

Madonna polarized views as her career continued as an aged woman. In a famous citation, Piers Morgan blasted Madonna's version of feminism. The editors of Ageing Women in Literature and Visual Culture (2017) decry that as Morgan proclaimed himself an "ardent feminist", he used Madonna's repudiation of cultural norms relating to aging to attack feminism itself. "It seems feminism is acceptable only at the expense of the exclusion of ageing women", they concluded. Niamh Middleton from Feminist Studies in Religion criticized Morgan, and his article entitled "Falling off the stage, Madonna, is God's way of telling you you're too old to cavort like a hooker" as a result of her falling stage in the Brit Awards 2015.

Professor Churchwell claimed in 2018, that Madonna "remains the hero of her own story, rejecting the pieties of certain versions of feminism and insisting that no one else defines her". During the heyday of her feminist attention, Madonna declared: "There is these days, a whole polemic among feminists, and some of them believe I have set the women's movement backward. Others, on the contrary, claim that I have helped its progress. I myself think that intelligent women don't see me as a threat". Ann Brooks, pointed out in Postfeminisms: Feminism, Cultural Theory and Cultural Forms (2002) that Madonna's defense against some of the charges made by feminists about her work is to assert "authorial intentionality" and "unified identity".

Impact of Madonna's feminism 

Professor Sut Jhally has referred to Madonna as "an almost sacred feminist icon". However, Filipino website Preen, says "she's an icon for sure, albeit a controversial one", further saying not everyone might feel comfortable with Madonna being regarded as a feminism icon.

The advent of Madonna attained a considerable estimation by various scholars. One of them credited Madonna to popularize "feminist politics". As early as 1990, Caryn James considered her the "woman who most astutely embodies how feminism has shifted in the last decade (1980s)". Semiotician Marcel Danesi claimed that Madonna turned the tide in feminist theory, inspiring the movement known as post-feminism. Danesi argued that it "changed radically" the feminism. Michael Sweeney, professor of philosophy at Xavier University wrote in Justice Through Diversity?: A Philosophical and Theological Debate (2016) that Madonna "personified a peculiar form of feminism emerged in the late 1980s". Commentator Gil Troy called it "Madonna feminism", further adding that in an era worshiping power, other pop stars represented a popular form of girl power or "Madonna feminism". Alisa Solomon used the phrase "the age of Madonna".

In a 2003 article from Bust, Camille Paglia said "the ultimate person to thank is Madonna. She changed the face of feminism, exactly as I had prophesied" (referring to her 1990 article in The New York Times when labelled Madonna as "the future of feminism"). In 2017, she also stated "it happened". Jennifer Baumgardner in a review of book Madonna and Me: Women Writers on the Queen of Pop (2012) declared: "[...] our Madonna gave birth to femme-inism". Elissa Strauss in a 2012 article for The Forward discussed how Madonna defines third-wave feminism.

In music and entertainment industries 

Some feminists have praised Madonna for "opening new doors" for women in the entertainment business. Her feminism have been attributed with influencing other artists, with Australian magazine The Music claiming that "Madonna's corporeal feminism impacted on female rappers". For one scholar, Madonna epitomizes a "whole generation of artists" who have (sometimes unconsciously) become pillars of the "third wave". Musicologist Susan McClary has gone so far as to claim that Madonna's music itself challenges the whole history of Western narrative music by "refusing to bolster a masculine identity based on suppressing anything that it perceives as other".

British entertainment critic Stuart Maconie commented that some would say she "brought feminism to the forefront of pop". British sociologist David Gauntlett is of the opinion that Madonna boosted feminism in music. In his explanation, the sociologist argued that feminist message were not often a key to success in the mainstream pop charts before Madonna, although there were exceptions (like Janis Joplin or Aretha Franklin) but without a specific "feminist agenda" like her. He also concludes: "Madonna was the first person to remix her own populist version of feminism and make it part of a pop music success story". British professor Stephen J. Hunt, citing Madonna's influence in approaching different representations of feminism in her work (such as irony, parody or sexuality), pointed out that "today this ambiguity is a common theme in feminist analyses of women's music". In Multidisciplinary Perspectives on Women, Voice, and Agency (2020), scholars Berrin Yanıkkaya and Angelique Nairn, concluded that "Madonna music has now become synonymous with the performative nature of female pop music artists and their link with popular feminism".

In addition, Madonna is deemed a precursor to various feminist movements that influenced the music industry. In Girl Heroes, academic Susan Hopkins described Madonna as the "Godmother of Girl Power" understood as single-minded enterprise, ambition and self-absorption. Gauntlett recognized the importance of the Spice Girls within the girl power slogan, but in his words, Madonna was the "real pioneer". The same goes with the Destiny's Child about an independent woman, as the sociologist emphasizes how Madonna paved that way with her highly visible self-empowerment. In the same vein, critic Sally Banes suggested Madonna as a precursor of the Riot grrrl movement.

Madonna on women's roles 

Madonna has been noted for playing with female archetypes and gender roles, as the staff of The Daily Telegraph, put it as saying she has been a virgin, whore, wife, mother, witch, diva, saint or sinner. The importance of these perspectives in her career, was described by Robert C Sickels from Whitman College in 100 Entertainers Who Changed America (2013) by saying "her career has always been, justifiably or not, understood through the lens of her womanhood".

Discussions 
Two scholars explained that in areas such as women's roles or motherhood, Madonna "critiques and challenges widespread beliefs while at the same time reinforcing some of them". Sickels described "her portrayal of women is complex and often contradictory". Lorraine Gamman, Margaret Marshment along with other cultural studies analysts, examined Madonna as the epitome of the contractions concerning femininity presented in the media. In this vein, music critic Dave Marsh stated in New Book of Rock Lists (1994), "more than any other artist, Madonna deconstructed the roles that women play, not only in music but in all of popular culture". During this decade, professor Suzanna Danuta Walters considered the figure of Madonna "emblematic" of the "confused way women are represented in popular culture". After she became a mother in 1996, she reignited discussions about motherhood. Associate professor Diane Pecknold in American Icons (2006) explained she "became a highly contested symbol of motherhood".

Lynne Layton of Harvard University, said that Madonna has many different versions of femininity and "seems comfortable with all of them". Similarly, in Alison Piepmeier and Rory Dicker's book Catching a Wave: Reclaiming Feminism for the 21st Century (2016), Madonna is defined as a woman that "has made it clear that being female is just beginning of the many things women are" and is "fully aware of the ways in which women are made 'other'".

Criticisms
For her critics, Madonna corrupts the meaning of womanhood. By 2016, Australian feminist Melinda Tankard Reist charges her by saying "she has turned her back on the cause of women". British writer John Farman called her a "ridiculous caricature of the modern woman".

American feminist author Naomi Wolf denotes criticisms or "hating Madonna" as "she must be punished, for the same reason that every woman who steps out of line must be punished". An individual commented is not so "untypical position" for a woman, explaining:

For Guilbert, "the amount of reproaches that Madonna gets is proportional to her popularity". Writing for The Guardian in 2010, Charlotte Raven headlined how "the 'new feminism' went wrong", where discussed Madonna's figure, saying "Madonna-ised woman sees everything, and everyone, as a means to her end".

Praise
In Introducing Postmodernism: A Graphic Guide (2014), authors Richard Appignanesi and Chris Garratt explained that for some, "Madonna is the cyber-model of the 'New Woman'". Indeed, poet Karen Finley has averred that "all women should be as Madonna as possible". Publisher Michael O'Mara told Reuters on Madonna: "One of the most enigmatic and fascinating women of our time, Madonna is the undisputed female icon of the modern age".

Wolf, stated by 2012, Madonna "is doing wonders for the collective female psyche". Back years, academics Allyson Jule and Bettina Tate Pedersen in Being Feminist, Being Christian: Essays from Academia (2006) suggested that Madonna seemed "relevant" to millennial womanhood, as she embodied qualities that spoke to a more modern and feminist sensibility. When she was included in The Guardian list of Top 100 Women in 2011, they said "she inspires not because she gives other women a helping hand, but because she breaks the boundaries of what's considered acceptable for women".

Influence 
According to various analysts, her forays into women's roles crossed boundaries; critic Ty Burr commented that Madonna "engaged audiences in the debate over how we prefer women to behave in pop culture". In contrast to denominational religions, which assign "only" one role to womanhood, that of wife and mother, as Marcel Danesi claims, Madonna "has made it clear that pop culture can provide an equilibrium between sacred forms of womanhood and the profane forms".

Sickels believes her "social, cultural and political representations of female are perhaps Madonna's most long-lasting legacy". In 2007, Joseph A. Kotarba, a sociology professor at the University of Houston, stated she has helped "define what it means to be a woman in our late capitalistic culture".

A role model for other women 

Across different decades, Madonna was cited as a role model for other women, with Ken McLeod from University of Toronto writing in We are the Champions (2013), "her music and videos have influenced countless young women" for the past three decades. Professor Santiago Fouz-Hernandez wrote in Madonna's Drowned Worlds (2004) that she "emerged as a role model for women in many different cultures, symbolizing professional and personal independence in a male-dominated society, as well as sexual liberation". 

Georges-Claude Guilbert quotes Madonna as saying, "I'd rather feel women out there in the world can draw strength from what I've accomplished in my life than have other pop stars acknowledge their debt". In the description of American author Strawberry Saroyan, along with her ability to take her message beyond music, Madonna's "impact women's lives has been her legacy".

Heydays — present 

During her prime, Rene Denfeld explained she was "far more popular among young women", than "any feminist activist". In 1990, Caryn James called her "the most influential feminist of the day". Jana Wendt cited an early Camille Paglia's statement as saying: "What she did was to change a whole generation of younger women, and that's what changed feminism". In 2015, Christina Broussard from Portland Mercury said that when Madonna emerged decades ago, it was about more than the look she personified. It was about the message. Broussard explained that for a female pop star to have an overarching political statement was something of a rarity in the Reagan era, further explaining that from lyrics to her own persona, Madonna has never censored herself based on the traditional notions of femininity. In 1994, BBC Worldwide called Madonna and Margaret Thatcher "powerful role models for modern women, who are the first generation to take their careers for granted".  

After her heydays, her path still continued to be examined, recognized and appreciated by various. Entering in her 50s-years-old, The Associated Press dedicated an article discussing her as a role model for women plus-50. In a op-ed for PerthNow in 2023, Sarah Vine said she continued to be an icon of freedom, and for that many other women, including herself, "have huge respect for her". Jennifer Oliver O'Connell, wrote for Women in American History (2017), that "Madonna remains an important model of female independence and rebellion", with an "insistence" on maintaining control of her own projects that "stands in great contrast to earlier female recording artists".

Reproval or ambiguity
Conversely, some criticized those academics that gave Madonna a role status for young women in her heydays, including professor Sheila Jeffreys. Brian Beacom, from The Herald questioned broadsheet journals when many celebrated her 60-years old birthday and championed her as a role model for women, both in her heydays and present. He said, she's not a "game changer". In the 2010s, editor Erin Harde explained that she has never viewed Madonna as a role model, but rethink her as a possibly "feminist voice" after a discussion with scholar Roxanne Harde.

Depictions
Aside journalistic pieces devoted to discuss Madonna as a role model for women, including one from Washington Post in 1990, some books about Madonna, have been focused on women's feelings towards Madonna, including I Dream of Madonna: Women's Dreams of the Goddess of Pop (1993), and Madonna and Me: Women Writers On The Queen Of Pop (2012). India Knight's novel My Life on a Plate (2000), have a heroine that models herself on Madonna, with the aspects of modern woman.

Over years, public figures including Lady Gaga, whom said in 2016, she's the role model "us girls need", have cited Madonna or praised her as well, such as actress Anne Hathaway, who commented in 2022:

All-female lists 
Madonna has been included in listicles. William Langley from The Daily Telegraph stated in 2011, that she has been a fixture of several "list of world's most powerful/admired/influential women". For example, in 2022, she featured on Women in the World's list of 50 Most Popular Women in the World. 

Madonna was also awarded in her industry. She won the inaugural Women of the Year by Glamour in 1990, and received the Women of the Year Billboard Women in Music of 2016. Media personality Anderson Cooper said about her ongoing influence during the ceremony: "As far as I'm concerned in terms of music and impact and culture, she's been the Woman of the Year every year since she released her first single 'Everybody' in 1982". Time also included her in their rank "100 Women of the Year".

Activism and referential works 

Madonna has been noted for her activism for women's rights, and also for her forays into feminism in her own way. Author James Dickerson in Women on Top (1998), considered Madonna a "true pioneer [...] in the arena of women's rights". J. Randy Taraborrelli believes that Madonna has a strong responsibility to feminism because she has been beacon for it for most of her life. Camille Paglia explained that Madonna condoned the "degradation" and "humiliation" of women. Also, she exposes the puritanism and suffocating ideology of American feminism.

In 2016, after receiving the Billboard Women of the Year, Madonna touched on sexism and misogyny, and the criticisms she faced, concluding: "'Oh, if you're a feminist, you don't have sexuality, you deny it', so I said 'fuck it. I'm a different kind of feminist. I'm a bad feminist'". In previous years, Charlotte Krause Prozan quoted Madonna in The Technique of Feminist Psychoanalytic Psychotherapy (1993) describing herself as a feminist, by saying: "I may be dressing like the traditional bimbo, whatever, but I'm in charge, and isn't that what feminism is all about". "I'm not a feminist, I'm a humanist", she declared at one point in her career.

In 2017, during A Year of Yes: Reimagining Feminism at the Brooklyn Museum, Madonna took the stage wearing a shirt with "feminist" (all caps) emblazoned on the front and at one point in her conversation with Marilyn Minter, she vowed to "personally slap" any man in the room that did not identify as a feminist. The same year, commemorating the International Women's Day, she released a 12-minute short film called Her Story and which was dedicated "to all women that fight for freedom" and highlighted the fight for gender equality. The short clip ends with two figures carrying a banner that reads "we should all be feminists". Also, during that year Madonna was one of dozens of celebrities who attended the Women's March in Washington D.C. singing "Express Yourself" and "Human Nature". In 2018, Madonna proclaimed her solidarity with the Ele Não movement. In 2019, she talked about the MeToo movement.

See also

 Cultural impact of Madonna

Notes

References

Print sources

Further reading
 10 Quotes on Feminism From Madonna’s Pre-Inauguration Talk With Marilyn Minter — Artnet
 Madonna: Feminist Icon Or Exploiter Of Women? — Ben Vaughn
 Madonna: A Good Role Model For Women — Ben Vaughn
 

Madonna
Feminism